Michael Paye (born March 24, 1983) is an American wheelchair basketball player and a member of the United States men's national wheelchair basketball team.

Career
Paye has represented the United States at the Wheelchair Basketball World Championship four times, winning silver medals in 2006, 2014 and 2018 and a bronze medal in 2010.

Paye has represented the United States in Wheelchair basketball at the Summer Paralympics five times, finishing in seventh place in 2004, fourth place in 2008, winning a bronze medal in 2012 and gold medals in 2016 and 2020.

References

1983 births
Living people
Basketball players from Detroit
American men's wheelchair basketball players
Paralympic wheelchair basketball players of the United States
Medalists at the 2011 Parapan American Games
Medalists at the 2019 Parapan American Games
Wheelchair basketball players at the 2004 Summer Paralympics
Wheelchair basketball players at the 2008 Summer Paralympics
Wheelchair basketball players at the 2012 Summer Paralympics
Wheelchair basketball players at the 2016 Summer Paralympics
Wheelchair basketball players at the 2020 Summer Paralympics
Medalists at the 2012 Summer Paralympics
Medalists at the 2016 Summer Paralympics
Medalists at the 2020 Summer Paralympics
Paralympic medalists in wheelchair basketball
Paralympic gold medalists for the United States
Paralympic bronze medalists for the United States
21st-century American people